Iron West is a western steampunk graphic novel by American comic book creator Doug TenNapel. It was published by Image Comics in 2006.

The story is set in the American Old West, but features modern day objects such as robots.

References

External links

Interviews
 TenNapel Strikes Gold in "Iron West", Comic Book Resources, May 17, 2006

Reviews
 Iron West Review, Comics Bulletin
 Iron West Review, IGN

2006 in comics
2006 comics debuts
Image Comics graphic novels
Steampunk comics
Western (genre) comics
Science fiction Westerns
Comics by Doug TenNapel